Božidar "Bota" Nikolić (1 January 1942 – 13 May 2021) was a Serbian film director and screenwriter.

He directed the films Balkan Spy, The Dark Side of the Sun, Three Tickets to Hollywood, In the Name of Father and Son, and Balkan Brothers.

References

External links 
 
 

1942 births
2021 deaths
People from Nikšić
Serbs of Montenegro
Serbian film directors
Serbian cinematographers